Parcopresis, also termed psychogenic fecal retention, is the inability to defecate without a certain level of privacy. The level of privacy involved varies from sufferer to sufferer.  The condition has also been termed shy bowel. This is to be distinguished from the embarrassment that many people experience with defecation in that it produces a physical inability, albeit of psychological origin.

Parcopresis is not a medically recognized condition.

History
Parcopresis is described as an inability to defecate when other people are perceived or are likely to be nearby (e.g., in the same public toilet, house or building). This inability affects the sufferer's lifestyle to varying degrees, ranging from the urge to defecate only in a limited number of “safe” places, to — in less severe presentations — allowing for defecation in places where the person is unknown and unlikely to become known in the future, such that any embarrassment is unlikely to have consequences lasting beyond the  episode itself. The level of restriction varies depending on the severity of each sufferer's condition.

See also 
Paruresis, an inability to urinate
Encopresis

References

Further reading

Shyness
Anxiety disorders
Phobias